A container port or container terminal is a facility where cargo containers are transshipped between different transport vehicles, for onward transportation. The transshipment may be between container ships and land vehicles, for example trains or trucks, in which case the terminal is described as a maritime container port. Alternatively, the transshipment may be between land vehicles, typically between train and truck, in which case the terminal is described as an inland container port.

In November 1932, the first inland container port in the world was opened by the Pennsylvania Railroad company in Enola, Pennsylvania.

Port Newark-Elizabeth on the Newark Bay in the Port of New York and New Jersey is considered the world's first maritime container port. On April 26, 1956, the Ideal X was rigged for an experiment to use standardized cargo containers that were stacked and then unloaded to a compatible truck chassis at Port Newark. The concept had been developed by the McLean Trucking Company. On August 15, 1962, the Port Authority of New York and New Jersey opened the world’s first container port, Elizabeth Marine Terminal.

Maritime container ports tend to be part of a larger port, and the biggest maritime container ports can be found situated around major harbours. Inland container ports tend to be located in or near major cities, with good rail connections to maritime container ports.

It is common for cargo that arrives to a container port in a single ship to be distributed over several modes of transportation for delivery to inland customers. According to a manager from the Port of Rotterdam, it may be fairly typical way for the cargo of a large 18,000 TEU container ship to be distributed over  19 container trains (74 TEU each), 32 barges (97 TEU each) and 1,560 trucks (1.6 TEU each, on average). The further container terminal, in April 2015, such APM Terminal Maasvlakte II, that adapts the advanced technology of remotely-controlled STS gantry cranes and conceptions of sustainability, renewable energy, and zero carbon dioxide emission.

Both maritime and inland container ports usually provide storage facilities for both loaded and empty containers. Loaded containers are stored for relatively short periods, whilst waiting for onward transportation, whilst unloaded containers may be stored for longer periods awaiting their next use. Containers are normally stacked for storage, and the resulting stores are known as container stacks.

In recent years methodological advances regarding container port operations have considerably improved, such as container port design process. For a detailed description and a comprehensive list of references see, e.g., the operations research literature.

See also

Cargo airline
Container port design process
Containerization
Dock (maritime)
List of container ports
Pick and pack
Receipt
Warehouse

References

External links
 Destiny of a Maritime Nation, a 2018 documentary by Channel NewsAsia, discusses Singapore's 1960s shift to container traffic and interviews port workers present at the time.  (Sequence covering containerization begins near time index 28:40)

Water transport